Axonopus fissifolius is a grass species which is often used as permanent pasture.

Common names include common carpetgrass, caratao grass, and Louisiana grass in the United States, and mat grass, narrow-leaved carpet grass, and Durrington grass in Australia.

References

External links
Axonopus fissifolius. Tropical Forages.

Panicoideae
Flora of South America
Flora of Central America
Flora of the Southeastern United States
Native grasses of California
Grasses of Argentina
Flora of Argentina
Forages
Grasses of the United States
Grasses of Alabama
Flora without expected TNC conservation status